Centerville is an unincorporated community in Wilson Township, Winona County, Minnesota, United States.

The community is located along Winona County Road 12, near its junction with Blackberry Road.

State Highways 43 (MN 43) and 76 (MN 76); and Interstate 90 are also nearby.

Centerville is located within ZIP code 55987, based in Winona.  Nearby places include Winona, Wilson, Witoka, and Ridgeway.

References

Unincorporated communities in Minnesota
Unincorporated communities in Winona County, Minnesota